Kolsva is a locality situated in Köping Municipality, Västmanland County, Sweden with 2,453 inhabitants in 2010.

References

External links

Kolsva 

Populated places in Västmanland County
Populated places in Köping Municipality